The Air Tractor AT-802 is an American agricultural aircraft that may also be adapted into fire-fighting or armed versions. It first flew in the United States in October 1990 and is manufactured by Air Tractor The AT-802 carries a chemical hopper between the engine firewall and the cockpit. In the U.S., it is considered a Type III SEAT, or Single Engine Air Tanker.

Development

In its standard configuration, the aircraft utilizes conventional landing gear (two main wheels and a tail wheel). However, a number of aircraft have been converted to the Fire Boss aerial firefighting configuration, which utilizes Wipaire 10000 amphibious floats, so that it can land on a traditional runway or on water. The Fire Boss can scoop water from a lake or river for use on a fire. In addition to the  standard fuselage-mounted retardant tank, the Fire Boss can have optional  foam tanks in the floats. Operations with floats installed have been shown to produce a shorter and narrower retardant drop pattern than wheeled AT-802s.

Armed version

A reinforced wing spar was certified for 12,000 hours of flight time, and the AT-802U was displayed in 2009 at the Paris Air Show.

The AT-802 has also been used in counter-drug operations in the USSOUTHCOM AOR by the U.S. Department of State as a delivery vehicle for herbicides and defoliants over narcotics production facilities.

Ten AT-802i were converted by IOMAX USA into an armed configuration with Roketsan Cirit 2.75" rockets and guided bombs for the UAE Air Force. The UAE operated them until November 2015 when they were replaced by the first three of 24 Archangels on order from Iomax. The Archangel is based on a similar cropduster airframe, that of the Thrush Model 660, however to create the Archangel the basic Model 660 undergoes a much more extensive rebuild in the course of its militarization. Six of the UAE AT-802i were transferred to the Jordanian Air Force with a further three being transferred to the Yemeni Government Forces where they have been used in the 2015 Yemeni Civil War. Reports place Emirati aircraft in Libya flown by contract pilots.

In January 2017, the US State Department approved a deal for twelve AT-802 aircraft for the Kenya Defence Forces, although as of June 2017 a contract for the proposed sale had not been signed.

On 1 August 2022, United States Special Operations Command indicated they would purchase up to 75 AT-802U Sky Warden aircraft to support special operations forces in fighting irregular wars. Air Tractor will manufacture the airframes and L3Harris will then modify them into the Armed Overwatch mission configuration. The planes are intended to perform armed intelligence, surveillance and reconnaissance (ISR) missions at low cost in permissive environments from austere locations, and will allow SOCOM to remove the aging U-28A Draco from combat service. The Sky Warden can deploy guided weapons including the APKWS rocket, GBU-12 laser-guided bomb, and Hellfire and Griffin missiles; it has a six-hour loiter time at a  radius. The initial contract is for $170 million, with a ceiling of $3 billion for purchase of the full fleet. The plan is for five squadrons of 15 planes, one deployed at a time, three undergoing maintenance, and one for training. Initial service entry is expected in 2026, with all delivered and full operating capability reached in 2029.

Variants

  – two seat (tandem) cockpit
  – single-seat cockpit
  – two seat (tandem) armored military version, modified with sensors and reinforced for weapons carriage
 AT-802U Sky Warden – An ISR Strike Aircraft based on AT-802U.  The AT-802U was selected in August 2022 as the winner of the United States Special Operations Command Armed Overwatch programme, with an initial buy of 6 airframes. 
  or AT-802AF – An aerial firefighting model 802 equipped with the Air Tractor Computerized Firegate designed/developed/serviced by Trotter Controls Inc.
AT-802F Fire Boss – AT-802F equipped with Wipaire amphibious floats for operations from land or water
 – An ISR and light-attack aircraft based on AT-802U, which developed by L3 Platform Integration collaboration with Air Tractor. L3 rebranded it as OA-8 Longsword for Asia-Pacific region.

Operators

Civil
The aircraft is popular with aerial application operators.

 Air Spray
 Buffalo Airways
 Conair Group
Early Bird Air Ltd

Military and government

 

Queensland Fire and Emergency Services

Military of Burkina Faso 1 AT-802

 Government of Northwest Territories

 National Forestry Corporation – 3 AT-802F  

 National Police of Colombia – 9 AT-802  
 National System of Disaster and Risk Management – 2 AT-802 

Croatian Air Force – 5 AT-802A Fire Boss + 1 AT-802F as of November 2014

Egyptian Air Force – 12 AT-802U (acquired from the UAE in 2016, first spotted in service in January 2018)

Military of Gambia
 
PT Pertamina

Israeli Air Force – 14 AT-802F, purchased second-hand from Spain (of which 2 formerly were Fire Boss, but exchanged for standard configuration aircraft) 1 crashed due to mechanical malfunction.

 Royal Jordanian Air Force – 6 IOMAX AT-802i Block 1 being upgraded to armed Block 2 standard, of which 1 upgraded aircraft delivered as of January 2018 and 4 AT-802s supplied by L-3 Corporation and originally intended for Yemen.

Police of Montenegro – 1 AT-802 + 3 AT-802A

Protection and Rescue Directorate of North Macedonia – 3 AT-802A Fire Boss
 
Ministry of Internal Administration

Ministry of Environment (CEGISA) – 3 AT-802A
Avialsa T35 – 15 AT-802 + 14 AT-802F 

Swedish Civil Contingencies Agency – 4 AT-802 Fire boss

Minnesota Department of Natural Resources – contracts out 2 AT-802Fs from Aero Spray of Appleton, Minnesota
US State Department Air Wing – 2 AT-802s, used to spray herbicides on narcotics fields
United States Forest Service – Multiple AT-802s, used for aerial firefighting
United States Special Operations Command – contract for an initial six aircraft with a potential delivery of up to 75 aircraft signed in August 2022 for the Armed Overwatch programme.
 
Yemeni Air Force

Former operators

 United Arab Emirates Air Force – 24 IOMAX AT-802i BPA

Specifications (AT-802)

See also

References
Notes

Bibliography

 Ayton, Mark. "Archangel: Crop Duster to Tank Buster". Air International, Vol. 92, No. 2, February 2017. pp. 24–33. .
Hoyle, Craig. "World Air Forces Directory". Flight International, 13–19 December 2011. pp. 26–52.
 Jackson, Paul. Jane's All The World's Aircraft 2003–2004. Coulsdon, UK: Jane's Information Group, 2003. .
 Keijsper, Gerard. "Water-Bombers Required!" Air Forces Monthly, London: Key Publishing, July 2008 Issue.

External links

 Air Tractor website

AT-802
1990s United States special-purpose aircraft
1990s United States agricultural aircraft
Low-wing aircraft
Aerial firefighting aircraft
Floatplanes
Amphibious aircraft
Single-engined tractor aircraft
Aircraft first flown in 1990
Single-engined turboprop aircraft
Anti-agriculture weapons